Totally Killer is an upcoming American slasher comedy film directed by Nahnatchka Khan and written by Jen D'Angelo and David Matalon & Sasha Perl-Raver. It stars Kiernan Shipka, Olivia Holt, Julie Bowen, and Randall Park. It is produced by Jason Blum, under his Blumhouse Television banner, and Adam Hendricks and Greg Gilreath under their Divide/Conquer banner.

Plot 
After Jamie's mother is murdered by the Sweet Sixteen Killer on Halloween, she travels back in time to 1987 where she must stop the young would-be-killer and get back to her timeline before she's trapped in the past forever.

Cast 
 Kiernan Shipka as Jamie 
 Julie Bowen as Pam
 Olivia Holt as Teen Pam
 Randall Park
 Lochlyn Munro as Adult Blake
 Charlie Gillespie as Teen Blake
 Liana Liberato as Tiffany Clark
 Kelcey Mawema as Amelia

Production 
In May 2022, Amazon Studios and Blumhouse Television announced Totally Killer which is being directed by Nahnatchka Khan and written by Jen D'Angelo and David Matalon & Sasha Perl-Raver with starring Kiernan Shipka, Olivia Holt, Julie Bowen, and Randall Park set to star.

Filming
Principal photography on the film began in May 2022.

Release
Totally Killer is set to be released by Amazon Studios.

References

External links 
 

Upcoming films
Upcoming English-language films
American slasher films
Blumhouse Productions films
Films produced by Jason Blum
Amazon Prime Video original films
2020s American films